The angel Jophiel (Heb.  Yōp̄īʾēl, "God is my beauty"), also called Iophiel, Iofiel, Jofiel, Yofiel, Youfiel, Zophiel ( Ṣōp̄īʾēl, "God is my watchman") and Zuriel ( Ṣūrīʾēl, "God is my rock"), is an archangel in Christian and Jewish angelology.

Beliefs in religions and ceremonial magic 

According to the pseudepigraphal Revelation of Moses, another name for Jophiel is Dina (Hebrew: דִּינָה Dīnā, "Judgement"). In the text, Jophiel/Dina is described as an angel of the seventh heaven, a Cabalistic guardian of the Torah (and wisdom itself), who taught 70 languages to souls at the dawn of creation.  The Zohar lists her as a Great Angel Chief in charge of 53 legions who superintend Torah-readings on the Sabbath.  Jophiel is said to be a companion to the angel Metatron.

C.E. Clement, in her book Angels in Art, names Jophiel as the teacher of Ham, Japheth, and Shem.  Heinrich Cornelius Agrippa and Thomas Rudd likewise name Jophiel as the teacher of Shem.

In the Anglican tradition, Jophiel is recognized as an archangel. She is often depicted in iconography holding a flaming sword, such as the stained glasses at St Michael's Church in Brighton, St Peter and St John's Church in Kirkley, Holy Trinity Church in Coventry and a mural at St. John's Episcopal Church in Memphis, Tennessee.

Jophiel is an Archangel of the Kabbalah (though some systems put Raziel in her place) and in several listings including that of the early medieval theologian Pseudo-Dionysus. The Calendarium Naturale Magicum Perpetuum lists Jophiel as the angel of the Sephira Chokhmah, as do the Key of Solomon variant "The Veritable Clavicles of Solomon," and the Sixth and Seventh Books of Moses, both latter works derived from the Calendarium. Agrippa attributes Jophiel to Saturn, while Paracelsus assigns her to Jupiter. Rudd attributes the Zodiac to Jophiel along with the Sephira Binah instead of Zaphkiel. According to Robert Ambelain, Jophiel is in charge of the Cherubim, particularly the Shemhamphorasch angels Haziel, Aladiah, Lauviah, Hahaiah, Iezalel, Mehahel, Hariel, and Hakamiah.

See also 
 List of angels in theology
 Yufin-Yufafin in Mandaeism

Notes

References

Further reading
 Fischer, Lynn (1996), Angels of Love and Light [with original paintings of the Seven Beloved Archangels and Their Archeiai by Marius Michael-George], Transformational Media Publications, South Yarmouth, MA
 "Jophiel," Pearls of Wisdom, Volume 7 Number 43, 1994, The Summit Lighthouse, Copyright © 1997 Church Universal and Triumphant
 "Seven Beloved Archangels Speak," 1954, The Bridge to Freedom

Individual angels
Archangels
Angels in Judaism
Angels in Christianity
Anglican saints